This is the results breakdown of the local elections held in Aragon on 8 May 1983. The following tables show detailed results in the autonomous community's most populous municipalities, sorted alphabetically.

Overall

City control
The following table lists party control in the most populous municipalities, including provincial capitals (shown in bold). Gains for a party are displayed with the cell's background shaded in that party's colour.

Municipalities

Calatayud
Population: 17,666

Huesca
Population: 41,455

Teruel
Population: 25,935

Zaragoza
Population: 571,855

See also
1983 Aragonese regional election

References

Aragon
1983